"Sky" is a song co-written and performed by British singer and DJ Sonique. It was released on 19 June 2000 as the third single from her debut studio album, Hear My Cry (2000), peaking at number two on the UK Singles Chart and number one in Romania.

Track listings

UK CD single
 "Sky" (radio edit)
 "Sky" (Sharam Jey remix)
 "Sky" (The Conductor & The Cowboy remix)
 "Sky" (video)

UK 12-inch single
A1. "Sky" (The Conductor & The Cowboy remix)
B1. "Sky" (Sharam Jey remix)
B2. "Sky" (album version)

UK cassette single
 "Sky" (radio edit)
 "Sky" (Sharam Jey remix)
 "Sky" (The Conductor & The Cowboy remix)

European CD single
 "Sky" (radio edit) – 3:59
 "It Feels So Good" (radio edit) – 3:49

European maxi-CD single
 "Sky" (radio edit) – 3:59
 "Sky" (Sonique remix) – 6:25

Australian CD single
 "Sky" (radio edit) – 3:59
 "Sky" (Sonique remix) – 6:25
 "Sky" (The Conductor & The Cowboy remix) – 8:13
 "Sky" (Sharam Jey remix) – 7:40

Charts and certifications

Weekly charts

Year-end charts

Certifications

Release history

References

1999 songs
2000 singles
Number-one singles in Poland
Number-one singles in Romania
Republic Records singles
Songs written by Rick Nowels
Sonique (musician) songs